The beautiful skyline of St. Louis, is home to some of the most architecturally significant buildings in the United States. From its eye catching gateway arch, from its beautiful granite facade, copper roofed One metropolitan square. The St. Louis skyline is unique because of its architecture, but also the fact that St. Louis has some of the most historical buildings in the country. Located in its skylines heart of downtown, such as the historical wainwright building which is one of the United States first skyscraper’s built, designed by famed architect  Louis Sullivan. Another prominent St. Louis famed building is its beautiful old courthouse where the Dred Scott case took place.  Some of its other tallest buildings include the 909 chestnut street building, and the second tallest courthouse in the world the Thomas F. Eagleton United States Courthouse.

History
The history of skyscrapers in St. Louis began with the 1850s construction of Barnum's City Hotel, a six-story building designed by architect George I. Barnett. Until the 1890s, no building in St. Louis rose over eight stories, but construction in the city rose during that decade owing to the development of elevators and the use of steel frames. The first building to use a steel frame in St. Louis was the  1890-91 Wainwright Building, a 10-story office building that was one of the first modern skyscrapers. Designed by Louis Sullivan and Dankmar Adler, it illustrates Sullivan's principle of "form follows function". Throughout the 1890s and into the 1900s, St. Louis saw construction move westward, especially that of office buildings. In 1914, the Railway Exchange Building was completed, which became the city's tallest building for many years. The city then underwent a moderate building boom in the 1920s leading to the planning of the Jefferson National Expansion Memorial in 1935.

Four of the top 30 towers have been added in the 21st century; the most recent is the Tower at OPOP, a 25-story,  tower completed in 2014 for $70 million.

Tallest buildings

This includes spires and architectural details but does not include antenna masts. An equal sign (=) following a rank indicates the same height between two or more buildings. The "Year" column indicates the year in which a building was completed. The "Floors" column indicates floors above ground only.

Tallest buildings by pinnacle height

This list ranks St. Louis skyscrapers based on their pinnacle height, which includes radio masts and antennas. As architectural features and spires can be regarded as subjective, some skyscraper enthusiasts prefer this method of measurement. Standard architectural height measurement, which excludes antennas in building height, is included for comparative purposes.

Tallest under construction, approved, planned, and proposed, 
A floor count of 10 stories is used in place of the  limit if the building's proposed height has not yet been determined.

Timeline of tallest buildings

This lists buildings that once held the title of tallest building in St. Louis, based on standard height measurement.

See also

 List of tallest buildings in Missouri
 List of tallest buildings in the United States

Notes

References

External links
St. Louis skyscrapers at Emporis.com
St. Louis skyscrapers at SkyscraperPage.com 

St. Louis

Tallest in St. Louis
St. Louis-related lists